Miles Platting and Newton Heath is an electoral ward in the city of Manchester, North West England which covers the districts of Miles Platting and Newton Heath. The population of this ward at the 2011 census was 14,693.

Councillors 

The three Labour Party councilors who represent the ward are John Flanagan, June Hitchen and Carmine Grimshaw.

 indicates seat up for re-election.

Elections in 2020s 
* denotes incumbent councillor seeking re-election.

May 2021

Elections in 2010s

May 2019

May 2018

May 2016

May 2015

May 2014

May 2012

May 2011

May 2010

References



Manchester City Council Wards